Mart Siimann's cabinet was in office in Estonia from 17 March 1997 to 25 March 1999, when it was succeeded by Mart Laar's second cabinet.

Members

This cabinet's members were the following:
 Mart Siimann – Prime Minister
 Riivo Sinijärv – Minister of Interior Affairs
 Toomas Hendrik Ilves – Minister of Foreign Affairs
 Paul Varul – Minister of Justice
 Jaak Leimann – Minister of Economic Affairs

References

Cabinets of Estonia